Singye-sa is a Korean Buddhist temple located in Onjong-ri in Kosong County, Kangwon Province, North Korea. Once one of the largest of the hundreds of temples located in scenic Mount Kumgang, the complex was destroyed by US bombings during the Korean War. It was reconstructed in 2004 as an inter-Korean cultural project. It is listed as National Treasure #95.

History
Singye Temple was founded under the kingdom of Silla in 519, which favored Buddhism as its state religion. Its location, in sacred Mount Kumgang, was especially chosen for its natural beauty, and the temple grew, it eventually became known as one of the four major temples of Mount Kumgang. Its fame lasted into the Japanese occupation, when the temple was well known as a tourist destination (under its Japanese pronunciation, Shinkei-ji).

The entire complex was destroyed by US fighter planes in 1951, at the start of the Korean War, as the US army believed the temple to be housing soldiers of the Korean People's Army; thus, despite its historical significance, the temple was firebombed. In 2004 reconstruction began on the temple, financed in part by the Jogye Order and the Korean Buddhist Association, and the temple complex was completed in 2006. Its reopening was attended by leading members of both groups.

Composition

The temple was arranged with shrines, living quarters, and kitchens arranged around a courtyard fronting the main prayer hall. 

Unlike many other Korean temples, which have free-standing gates at their entrance, the temple's entrance gate is located under Manse Pavilion ("Pavilion of Ten thousand years"), a two-storey structure with storage on the first floor and a meditation room on the second.

In the temple's central courtyard stands a Silla Dynasty stone pagoda, carved with intricate depictions of various Buddhist guardian deities. This is the only artifact to have survived the US bombings of the temple.

Taeung Hall was built as the temple's main prayer hall in the 18th century. By far the temple's largest building, it served as the focal point for the compound. It also housed a collection of icons and nine statues of various Buddhist guardians, saints (arhats), and deities. The hall was also destroyed by the American forces and was the first of the temple's buildings to be reconstructed.

To the right of the hall is the small Bell Pavilion, where stands a replica of the temple's original 16th-century bell, also destroyed in 1951.

References

External links
 Korea  Bridging the divide
 Buddhist Temple Being Restored in N. Korea

See also
Four Great Temples of Mt. Kumgang
National Treasures of North Korea
Korean Buddhism
Korean architecture

Buildings and structures in Kangwon Province
Buddhist temples in North Korea
National Treasures of North Korea
519 establishments